IKL may refer to:
 Concentration Camps Inspectorate, the agency that oversaw Nazi concentration camps, German acronym
The Patriotic People's Movement, whose Finnish language name had the initials IKL.
The Patriotic People's Movement (1993), also with initials IKL
The Ingolstadt–Kralupy–Litvínov pipeline, a crude oil pipeline in Germany and the Czech Republic
Ikela Airport, an airport in the Democratic Republic of the Congo with this IATA code
Ingenieurkontor Lübeck, a German shipbuilding company